Rhegmatophila alpina is a moth of the family Notodontidae. It is found in the Southern Alps, the Balkans and Spain.

The wingspan is 17–18 mm. The moth flies from May to September in two generations depending on the location.

The larvae feed on Populus and Salix species.

Sources 
 P.C.-Rougeot, P. Viette (1978). Guide des papillons nocturnes d'Europe et d'Afrique du Nord. Delachaux et Niestlé (Lausanne).

External links

 Fauna Europaea
 Lepiforum.de

Notodontidae
Moths of Europe
Moths of Asia